John Orwin (born 20 March 1954) is a former Rugby union lock.
Orwin toured New Zealand with England playing in both tests in 1985. He then captained  on their tour to Australia & Fiji in 1988.

He played for and captained Gloucester, Bedford, the Barbarians the Royal Air Force, and Combined Services.

References

External links
 Yorkshire post article
 independent article on Orwin
 Bedford history 

1954 births
Living people
Barbarian F.C. players
Bedford Blues players
Combined Services rugby union players
England international rugby union players
English rugby union players
Gloucester Rugby players
Gloucestershire County RFU players
20th-century Royal Air Force personnel
Royal Air Force rugby union players
Rugby union locks
Rugby union players from Bradford
Yorkshire County RFU players
Rugby union players from Yorkshire
Military personnel from Yorkshire